Helsinki University Central Hospital (HUCH;) is a hospital network in Finland. It is one of the largest hospitals in Europe. It encompasses 17 hospitals in Helsinki, Espoo and Vantaa, and has all major medical specialties represented. The HUCH Hospital Area is one of the five hospital areas making up the Hospital District of Helsinki and Uusimaa (HUS).

HUCH hospitals in Helsinki consist of the following: 
Aurora Hospital
Children's Castle
Children's Hospital
Department of Oncology
Eye and Ear Hospital
Meilahti Tower Hospital (Meilahti Hospital)
Meilahti Triangle Hospital
Psychiatrycenter
Skin and Allergy Hospital
Surgical Hospital
Women's Hospital.

HUCH hospitals in Espoo and Vantaa: 
Jorvi Hospital
Peijas Hospital

References

 

Hospital
Hospitals in Finland
Teaching hospitals
Töölö